Aladár Háberl (9 February 1898 – 19 May 1990) was a Hungarian skier. He competed in the Nordic combined event at the 1924 Winter Olympics.

References

External links
 

1898 births
1990 deaths
Hungarian male Nordic combined skiers
Olympic Nordic combined skiers of Hungary
Nordic combined skiers at the 1924 Winter Olympics
Skiers from Budapest